Mahopac ( or ) is a hamlet (and census-designated place) in the town of Carmel in Putnam County, New York, United States. As of the 2020 census, the population was 8,932.

History
Mahopac was originally inhabited by the Wappinger people, an Algonquian tribe. The hamlet's land was part of a huge tract encompassing all of today's Putnam County patented in 1697 by Adolphus Philipse, son of a wealthy Anglo-Dutch gentryman, known as the Philipse Patent.  During the French and Indian War, Wappingers throughout Putnam County traveled north to Massachusetts to fight for the British.

When the British Crown refused to return their land after the war, most Wappingers abandoned the area,  concentrating in Stockbridge, Massachusetts before relocating with other displaced Native Americans elsewhere. Farmers and their families migrated to Mahopac from as far away as Cape Cod and rented land from the Philipse family. Wheelwrights and blacksmiths set up shops to assist the tenant farmers.

Although no battles were fought in Mahopac during the American Revolution, the area was strategically important due to its location. With troop encampments in nearby Patterson, Yorktown, West Point, and Danbury, Connecticut, it was a cross-roads between key Colonial garrisons. Soldiers were stationed in Mahopac Falls to guard the Red Mills, an important center for grinding grain and storing flour for the American troops.

Upon Colonial victory in the Revolution, the Tory-sympathizing Philipse family lost its claim to the land, which was then resold to farmers and speculators by New York State. After the incorporation of Putnam County in 1812 the Mahopac area grew steadily. By the middle-19th century the hamlet had become a summer resort community. The New York and Harlem Railroad brought vacationers north from New York City to Croton Falls.  Hotels would often have competing races of decorated horse-drawn coaches bringing passengers from the train to Lake Mahopac. After the Civil War a direct rail spur was laid, creating boom times for the village.

The locale remained primarily a summer resort until after World War II, when nearby highways such as the Taconic State and Saw Mill River parkways began to make travel by automobile convenient.  With the passing of the New York Central Putnam Division's last passenger service to Mahopac in 1959, the hamlet evolved into a year-round community, many of its residents making the commute to New York City.

Today

Mahopac has a 5,200 sq. ft (480 sq. m) library, featuring multiple reading rooms overlooking Lake Mahopac, abundant computers, a law library and conference rooms. The library is host to many public events including adult education, technology instruction, and yoga classes.

The Carmel Historical Society Museum in the Old Town Hall on McAlpin Avenue features many fascinating area artifacts.

Mahopac has had several motion pictures filmed on location.  Among them are scenes from the 1982 comedy film Tootsie. An exterior shot is used in which the Mahopac Farm Playhouse exterior was converted to read "SYRACUSE FARM PLAYHOUSE."  The property, which at times has been host to flea markets and antique shows, was originally a dairy farm, which produced products sold as far south as New York City.  The Playhouse was closed in the mid-1980s, and the property, which lies along the Westchester County border, is now being considered for commercial development.

Lake Mahopac

The hamlet of Mahopac encircles picturesque  Lake Mahopac.  It contains three islands, Fairy, Petre, and Canopus, all privately owned.  Fairy Island sports multiple homes accessible via a short causeway; Petra boasts the Massaro House, a Frank Lloyd Wright-inspired residence, and a Wright-designed bungalo, the A. K. Chahroudi Cottage; Canopus is undeveloped.  Boating, fishing and other water sports are permitted on the lake.  Slips and support services are provided by two marinas.

Besides Lake Mahopac, other lakes within the Mahopac CDP include Kirk Lake, Lake Casse, Lake Secor, Teakettle Spout Lake, and Long Pond.  Lake Mahopac is within the Croton River watershed yet not a part of the New York City water supply system's Croton Watershed.  Kirk Lake, a controlled lake in that system, is both.

Mahopac Falls 
In colonial times a large gristmill sat near the present-day intersection of Route 6N, Hill Street, and Myrtle Avenue. Drawing its water from the streams that drained Kirk Lake and Lake Mahopac, it was the largest building in the entire county. Early settlers to the area, tenant farmers renting land from the Philipse family, provided grain for its wheel. Over time the mill's red paint came to identify the area, known to this day as "Red Mills."

It was the fall of the waters of the pond that drove the mill that gave the larger community comprising the southern half of the hamlet of Mahopac the name "Mahopac Falls."  Although the famous mill there is gone, one of its original millstones forms a part of the front steps of the Red Mills Branch of Mahopac National Bank.

Lake Secor

In the early 20th century Secor turned into a "bungalow city" where the urbanites spent their summer weekends. At first the area was largely Germans, later in the mid-1950s it peaked opening up to all family types. In the 1940s and '50s a summer camp for Jewish children (Secor Lake Camp) operated on the other side of the lake from the bungalows. In the 1970s Secor was divided half and half between the people that resided there and the city folk who came up on weekends. Today it has over 500 families living on the 26 roads that enclose it.

Geography

While the hamlet of Carmel is the seat of the county government, Mahopac, the largest population center in the town of Carmel, hosts the Town Hall.  Both Mahopac (ZIP code 10541) and Mahopac Falls (10542) have their own post offices.

Demographics

As of the census of 2010, there were 8,369 people, 2,943 households, and 2,258 families residing in the hamlet. The population density was 1,585.3 per square mile (617.6/km2). There were 3,260 housing units at an average density of 585.1/sq mi (225.8/km2). The racial makeup of the CDP was 91.1% White, 2.1% African American, 0.1% Native American, 2.0% Asian, 0% from other races, and 1.5% from two or more races. Hispanic or Latino of any race were 10.9% of the population. Mahopac also has a small, but noticeable Irish American community, and a significant Italian community present to this day.

There were 2,943 households, out of which 23.0% had children under the age of 18 living with them, 65.6% were married couples living together, 8.6% had a female householder with no husband present, and 22.7% were non-families. 17.6% of all households were made up of individuals, and 5.6% had someone living alone who was 65 years of age or older. The average household size was 2.74 and the average family size was 3.28.

In the hamlet the population was spread out, with 25.3% under the age of 18, 7.7% from 18 to 24, 30.8% from 25 to 44, 26.4% from 45 to 64, and 9.7% who were 65 years of age or older. The median age was 38 years. For every 100 females, there were 99.7 males. For every 100 females age 18 and over, there were 96.7 males.

The median income for a household in the community was $95,189, and the median income for a family was $91,148. Males had a median income of $52,315 versus $36,419 for females. The per capita income for the CDP was $44,494.  The percent of persons below poverty level was 5.0%.

The median value of owner-occupied housing units was $407,900.

Schools

The Mahopac Central School District is divided into five schools: three K-5 schools (Lakeview Elementary School, Fulmar Road Elementary School, and Austin Road Elementary School), a middle school for grades 6-8 (Mahopac Middle School) and a high school for grades 9-12 (Mahopac High School).

Historically, Mahopac had five one-room school houses that were united into one central school (now Lakeview Elementary School) in 1935.

In athletics, Mahopac boasts strong legacies in wrestling (John Degl 1991 NYS Champion & Joe Mazzurco 2000 NYS Champion), ice hockey (Section I Division II Champions 2000-2001 [The program's inaugural season]/2001-2002/2002-2003), basketball, softball, volleyball, gymnastics, field hockey, baseball (Dave Fleming, 1987 MHS graduate & former pitcher for the Seattle Mariners), football, track & field (Nick Lakis, 1968 MHS graduate and former mile record holder at the United States Naval Academy), and lacrosse. School teams have won several New York state championships, including the Boys Varsity Lacrosse team in 1996. A long-time rivalry exists between the "Indians" and the neighboring Carmel High School "Rams".

Since 1979, Mahopac has had a regionally competing marching band (The Cavaliers) and since 1982 the rock performance event Illusion.

St. John the Evangelist was a Catholic elementary school in Mahopac from 1955 until its closing in 2011. The school building remains with the active Church across the street from Lake Mahopac.

Pronunciation
Mahopac is an indigenous word meaning "Great Lake" or "Lake of the Great Serpent", with a Native American pronunciation.  Long-time Mahopac residents affirm that "Ma-HO-pac" was used by residents until the hamlet's large population expansion and demographic shift in the 1960s and '70s.

In spite of a 3–2 vote by the Carmel Town Board in favor of the traditional Native pronunciation, the modern-day first-syllable-inflected "MAY-o-pac" is used by a large number of residents today.  Stressing the similar pronunciation of other Native American communities nearby, Regina Morini, a retired Putnam County legislator and assistant to the Putnam County Executive, and a lifelong Mahopac resident, says, “Mohegan, Mohansic, Mahopac. The accent is on the second syllable.”

Notes

See also
 New York and Putnam Railroad, which first brought service to Mahopac
USS Mahopac, any of three namesake U.S. Navy ships: a Civil War era monitor, a post-WWI fleet tug, and a World-War-II-era rescue tugboat

References

External links

 Mahopac News
 Mahopac Real Estate
 Town of Carmel
 Mahopac Central School District
 Mahopac Public Library
 Mahopac Volunteer Fire Department
 Town of Carmel Police Department
 Greater Mahopac-Carmel Chamber of Commerce

Hamlets in New York (state)
Census-designated places in New York (state)
Census-designated places in Putnam County, New York
Hamlets in Putnam County, New York
Mahopac
Mahopac